This is a list of 288 species in Calleida, a genus of ground beetles in the family Carabidae.

Calleida species

 Calleida acutangula (Jeannel, 1949) c g
 Calleida aenea Chaudoir, 1873 c g
 Calleida aeneipennis Buquet, 1835 c g
 Calleida aeruginosa Dejean, 1825 c g
 Calleida affinis Chaudoir, 1837 c g
 Calleida alberti (Jeannel, 1949) c g
 Calleida alluaudi (Jeannel, 1949) c g
 Calleida alticola (Basilewsky, 1951) c g
 Calleida ambigua Chaudoir, 1873 c g
 Calleida ambreana (Jeannel, 1949) c g
 Calleida amethystina (Fabricius, 1787) c g
 Calleida andreae (Jeannel, 1949) c g
 Calleida androyana (Jeannel, 1949) c g
 Calleida angustata Dejean, 1831 c g
 Calleida angusticollis Boheman, 1848 c g
 Calleida arrowi Liebke, 1939 c g
 Calleida assimilis (Jeannel, 1949) c g
 Calleida aurata Motschulsky, 1864 c g
 Calleida aureola Bates, 1883 c g
 Calleida aurescens Bates, 1883 c g
 Calleida auripennis Liebke, 1939 c g
 Calleida aurulenta Chaudoir, 1852 c g
 Calleida baeri (Maindron, 1906) c g
 Calleida bahamensis Darlington, 1953 c g
 Calleida basalis Putzeys, 1845 c g
 Calleida basilewskyi (Casale, 1994) c g
 Calleida batesi Chaudoir, 1873 c g
 Calleida bella Chaudoir, 1873 c g
 Calleida bicolor Reiche, 1842 c g
 Calleida bogotana Liebke, 1935 c g
 Calleida brunnea Dejean, 1831 c g
 Calleida bryanti Liebke, 1939 c g
 Calleida buckleyi Liebke, 1939 c g
 Calleida callithera (Basilewsky, 1962) c g
 Calleida capensis Chaudoir, 1847 c g
 Calleida capreicolor Liebke, 1939 c g
 Calleida catalai (Jeannel, 1949) c g
 Calleida catharinae Liebke, 1939 c g
 Calleida cavicollis Chaudoir, 1873 c g
 Calleida cayennensis Chaudoir, 1873 c g
 Calleida caymanensis Darlington, 1947 c g
 Calleida centralis Fairmaire, 1887 c g
 Calleida chalybeipennis R.F.Sahlberg, 1844 
 Calleida championi Bates, 1883 c g
 Calleida chaudoiri Liebke, 1928 c g
 Calleida chevrolati Chaudoir, 1873 c g
 Calleida chinensis Jedlicka, 1934 c g
 Calleida chloroptera Dejean, 1831 c g
 Calleida chlorotaenia Bates, 1891 c g
 Calleida chryseis Bates, 1883 c g
 Calleida circumcincta Bates, 1883 i c g
 Calleida clara Chaudoir, 1873 c g
 Calleida congoana (Basilewsky, 1962) c g
 Calleida conica Reiche, 1842 c g
 Calleida conradsi Basilewsky, 1949 c g
 Calleida convexicollis Chaudoir, 1873 c g
 Calleida cordicollis Putzeys, 1845 c g
 Calleida corporaali Andrewes, 1929 c g
 Calleida corumbana Liebke, 1939 c g
 Calleida cuprea Chaudoir, 1873 c g
 Calleida cupreocincta Chaudoir, 1848 c g
 Calleida cupreola Liebke, 1939 c g
 Calleida cupreolimbata Liebke, 1936 c g
 Calleida cupreomarginata Chaudoir, 1850 c g
 Calleida cupripennis Chaudoir, 1872 c g
 Calleida cyanescens Brullé, 1837 c g
 Calleida cyanipennis Perty, 1830 c g
 Calleida cyanippe Bates, 1883 c g
 Calleida davidsoni Casale, 2008 c g
 Calleida decellei (Basilewsky, 1968) c g
 Calleida decolor Chaudoir, 1873 c g
 Calleida decora (Fabricius, 1801) i b
 Calleida decorsei (Jeannel, 1949) c g
 Calleida deplanata (Jeannel, 1949) c g
 Calleida desenderi Casale, 2011 c g
 Calleida discoidalis Heller, 1921 c g
 Calleida distincta Péringuey, 1896 c g
 Calleida dives Chaudoir, 1852 c g
 Calleida dolosa Liebke, 1939 c g
 Calleida doriae Bates, 1892 c g
 Calleida dualana Liebke, 1939 c g
 Calleida dyschroma Chaudoir, 1873 c g
 Calleida ecuadorica Liebke, 1939 c g
 Calleida estebanae Liebke, 1935 c g
 Calleida excellens Liebke, 1939 c g
 Calleida fabulosa Liebke, 1939 c g
 Calleida fasciata Dejean & Boisduval, 1829 c g
 Calleida fastuosa Klug, 1833 c g
 Calleida feana Liebke, 1936 c g
 Calleida femoralis Chaudoir, 1873 c g
 Calleida fervida Péringuey, 1904 c g
 Calleida festinans (Fabricius, 1801) c g
 Calleida fimbriata Bates, 1883 i c g b
 Calleida flava Chevrolat, 1833 c g
 Calleida flohri Bates, 1883 c g
 Calleida fossulata Liebke, 1939 c g
 Calleida freyi Jedlicka, 1960 c g
 Calleida fulgida Dejean, 1831 i c g
 Calleida fulvipes Reiche, 1842 c g
 Calleida fusca Brullé, 1837 c g
 Calleida fuscicollis Liebke, 1939 c g
 Calleida georgii Casale, 2008 c g
 Calleida gigantea Casale, 2008 c g
 Calleida gounellei Liebke, 1935 c g
 Calleida gracilis Gemminger & Harold, 1868 c g
 Calleida grata Péringuey, 1896 c g
 Calleida guyanensis Chaudoir, 1873 c g
 Calleida haematodera Chaudoir, 1873 c g
 Calleida haemorrhoa Fairmaire, 1896 c g
 Calleida hasterti Liebke, 1935 c g
 Calleida hoegei Bates, 1883 c g
 Calleida holochalca Alluaud, 1896 c g
 Calleida honesta Liebke, 1935 c g
 Calleida horni Liebke, 1934 c g
 Calleida howdeni Casale, 2008 c g
 Calleida ignicincta Fairmaire, 1897 c g
 Calleida ignobilis Bates, 1883 c g
 Calleida ikopae (Jeannel, 1949) c g
 Calleida insperans Liebke, 1935 c g
 Calleida insueta (Basilewsky, 1961) c g
 Calleida isabellae (Basilewsky, 1961) c g
 Calleida jansoni Bates, 1878 c g
 Calleida janthina Reiche, 1842 c g
 Calleida jeanneli Liebke, 1935 c g
 Calleida katangana (Basilewsky, 1961) c g
 Calleida kayae Casale, 2008 c g
 Calleida kivuensis Burgeon, 1937 c g
 Calleida klapperichi Jedlicka, 1964 c g
 Calleida koppeli Steinheil, 1875 c g
 Calleida lacunosa Mannerheim, 1837 c g
 Calleida laetipennis Bates, 1878 c g
 Calleida lamottei (Basilewsky, 1951) c g
 Calleida lampra Bates, 1883 c g
 Calleida latelimbata Liebke, 1935 c g
 Calleida latior Liebke, 1935 c g
 Calleida lativittis Chaudoir, 1873 c g
 Calleida lepida L.Redtenbacher, 1867 c g
 Calleida levistriata Chaudoir, 1873 c
 Calleida lieftincki Louwerens, 1958 c g
 Calleida limbata R.F.Sahlberg, 1847 c g
 Calleida limbipennis Liebke, 1935 c g
 Calleida lindigi Chaudoir, 1873 c g
 Calleida lojana Liebke, 1939 c g
 Calleida longicollis (Jeannel, 1949) c g
 Calleida lurida Chaudoir, 1873 c g
 Calleida macrocephala (Jeannel, 1949) c g
 Calleida macrospila Gestro, 1895 c g
 Calleida magnifica Chaudoir, 1873 c g
 Calleida malleri Liebke, 1939 c g
 Calleida marginalis (Jeannel, 1949) c g
 Calleida marginicollis Chaudoir, 1844 c g
 Calleida melzeri Liebke, 1934 c g
 Calleida mesotincta Liebke, 1939 c g
 Calleida metallica Dejean, 1825 c g
 Calleida migratoria Casale in Desender & al., 2002 c g
 Calleida minga (Basilewsky, 1961) c g
 Calleida misella Chaudoir, 1873 c g
 Calleida mniszechii Chaudoir, 1852 c g
 Calleida montana Liebke, 1939 c g
 Calleida moreti Casale, 2008 c g
 Calleida nantae Liebke, 1939 c g
 Calleida natalis Péringuey, 1899 c g
 Calleida nevillei (Basilewsky, 1972) c g
 Calleida nigricans Chaudoir, 1873 c g
 Calleida nigriceps Chaudoir, 1844 c g
 Calleida nigripes Péringuey, 1904 c g
 Calleida nigriventris Hope, 1842 c g
 Calleida nilgirensis Straneo, 1961 c g
 Calleida nimbae (Basilewsky, 1963) c g
 Calleida obrieni Mateu, 1995 i c g
 Calleida obscura Dejean, 1831 c g
 Calleida obscuroaenea Chaudoir, 1848 c g
 Calleida ohausi Liebke, 1939 c g
 Calleida olsoufieffi (Jeannel, 1949) c g
 Calleida onoha Bates, 1873 c g
 Calleida onorei Casale, 2008 c g
 Calleida optima Liebke, 1935 c g
 Calleida pallida Reiche, 1842 c g
 Calleida pallipes Andrewes, 1931 c g
 Calleida pauliana Liebke, 1939 c g
 Calleida permunda Chaudoir, 1873 c g
 Calleida perrieri (Jeannel, 1949) c g
 Calleida perroti Jedlicka, 1964 c g
 Calleida pexifrons Fairmaire, 1887 c g
 Calleida picicollis Liebke, 1935 c g
 Calleida picipes Chaudoir, 1854 c g
 Calleida planulata LeConte, 1858 i c g b
 Calleida platynoides G. Horn, 1882 i c g b
 Calleida plaumanni Liebke, 1939 c g
 Calleida plicaticollis Buquet, 1835 c g
 Calleida praegnans Liebke, 1939 c g
 Calleida praestans Chaudoir, 1878 c g
 Calleida pretiosa Chaudoir, 1873 c g
 Calleida procerula Chaudoir, 1873 c g
 Calleida prolixa Erichson, 1847 c g
 Calleida properans Chaudoir, 1873 c g
 Calleida propinqua Fleutiaux, 1887 c g
 Calleida pulcherrima Bates, 1883 c g
 Calleida punctata LeConte, 1846 i c g b
 Calleida punctulata Chaudoir, 1848 i c g b
 Calleida purpurea (Say, 1823) i c g b
 Calleida purpuripennis Chaudoir, 1873 c g
 Calleida quadricollis Straneo, 1961 c g
 Calleida quadriimpressa Chaudoir, 1848 c g
 Calleida rapax Andrewes, 1933 c g
 Calleida rawlinsi Casale, 2008 c g
 Calleida refulgens R.F.Sahlberg, 1847 c g
 Calleida regina Bates, 1883 c g
 Calleida resplendens Reiche, 1842 c g
 Calleida rhodoptera Chaudoir, 1850 c g
 Calleida rhytidera Chaudoir, 1873 c g
 Calleida robusta Chaudoir, 1873 c g
 Calleida rosea Liebke, 1935 c g
 Calleida rubiginosa Chaudoir, 1873 c g
 Calleida rubra Liebke, 1939 c g
 Calleida rubricollis Dejean, 1825 i c g
 Calleida ruficollis (Fabricius, 1801) c g
 Calleida rufiventris Chaudoir, 1877 c g
 Calleida rufocuprea Chaudoir, 1873 c g
 Calleida rufolimbata Motschulsky, 1864 c g
 Calleida rufopicea Casale, 2008 c g
 Calleida rugosicollis (Jeannel, 1949) c g
 Calleida rustica Bates, 1883 c g
 Calleida rutilans Chaudoir, 1850 c g
 Calleida sanguinicollis Dejean, 1831 c g
 Calleida saphyrina Chaudoir, 1848 c g
 Calleida schistoptera Chaudoir, 1873 c g
 Calleida schumacheri Steinheil, 1875 c g
 Calleida scintillans Bates, 1883 c g
 Calleida scutellaris Chaudoir, 1873 c g
 Calleida semicincta Bates, 1883 c g
 Calleida semifacta Bates, 1883 c g
 Calleida semirubra Bates, 1878 c g
 Calleida semiviolacea Liebke, 1935 c g
 Calleida sericinitens Bates, 1883 c g
 Calleida seyrigi (Jeannel, 1949) c g
 Calleida sicardi (Jeannel, 1949) c g
 Calleida silvicola Péringuey, 1896 c g
 Calleida similis Reiche, 1842 c g
 Calleida skwarrae Liebke, 1932 c g
 Calleida smaragdinipennis Reiche, 1842 c g
 Calleida smaragdula Reiche, 1843 c g
 Calleida somalica (Basilewsky, 1968) c g
 Calleida splendidula (Fabricius, 1801) c g
 Calleida strandi Liebke, 1939 c g
 Calleida striata Casey, 1913 
 Calleida subaenea Mannerheim, 1837 c g
 Calleida subfasciata (Basilewsky, 1953) c g
 Calleida suensoni Kirschenhofer, 1986 c g
 Calleida sulcatula Chaudoir, 1877 c g
 Calleida sultana Bates, 1892 c g
 Calleida sultanoides Straneo, 1961 c g
 Calleida sumptuosa Bates, 1883 c g
 Calleida suturalis Dejean, 1831 c g
 Calleida suturella Reiche, 1842 c g
 Calleida syllara (Basilewsky, 1961) c g
 Calleida tenuis Andrewes, 1929 c g
 Calleida terminata C.O.Waterhouse, 1876 c g
 Calleida tetrapora Bates, 1883 c g
 Calleida thalassina Dejean, 1831 c g
 Calleida tibialis Brullé, 1837 c g
 Calleida tinctipes Bates, 1883 c g
 Calleida tinctula Darlington, 1934 c g
 Calleida titschacki Liebke, 1951 c g
 Calleida translucens Liebke, 1935 c g
 Calleida tristis Brullé, 1837 c g
 Calleida tropicalis Bates, 1883 c g
 Calleida truncata Chevrolat, 1835 c g
 Calleida tunicata Liebke, 1939 c g
 Calleida turrialbae Liebke, 1936 c g
 Calleida umbrigera Chaudoir, 1873 c g
 Calleida urundiana (Basilewsky, 1956) c g
 Calleida variolosa Bates, 1883 c g
 Calleida ventralis Liebke, 1939 c g
 Calleida vignai Casale, 2008 c g
 Calleida villiersi (Basilewsky, 1953) c g
 Calleida violacea Reiche, 1842 c g
 Calleida violaceipennis (Jeannel, 1949) c g
 Calleida viridana Liebke, 1939 c g
 Calleida viridiaurea Chaudoir, 1877 c g
 Calleida viridicincta Motschulsky, 1864 c g
 Calleida viridicuprea Chaudoir, 1852 c g
 Calleida viridimicans Chaudoir, 1873 c g
 Calleida viridipallia Liebke, 1939 c g
 Calleida viridipennis (Say, 1823) i c g b
 Calleida viridivestis Liebke, 1939 c g
 Calleida wittei (Basilewsky, 1953) c g
 Calleida zumpti Liebke, 1939 c g

Data sources: i = ITIS, c = Catalogue of Life, g = GBIF, b = Bugguide.net

References

Calleida